Islaqucha (Spanish isla island, Quechua qucha lake,  Hispanicized spelling Islaccocha) is a lake in Peru located in the Ayacucho Region, Lucanas Province, in the districts of Chipao and Pukyu. Islaqucha lies north of Pukaqucha and west of Apiñaqucha.

See also
List of lakes in Peru

References

Lakes of Peru
Lakes of Ayacucho Region